Jack Hayes may refer to:

 Jack Hayes (composer) (1919–2011), American composer and orchestrator
 Jack Hayes (politician) (1887–1941), British police officer, trade unionist and politician
 Jack Hayes (footballer, born 1907) (1907–1971), Australian rules footballer for Footscray
 Jack Hayes (footballer, born 1996), Australian rules footballer for St Kilda
 Jack Hayes (field hockey) (born 1994), Australian field hockey player